Cotalpa consobrina is a beetle of the family Scarabaeidae.

Gallery

References 

Rutelinae
Beetles described in 1871
Taxa named by George Henry Horn